Abrar Ahmed (born 16 October 1998) is a Pakistani cricketer and leg spin bowler.

Ahmed was called up to the Pakistan team in December 2022 for the series against England at home. On 9 December he made his Test debut against England in the 2nd Test match of the series in Multan, where he took 7 wickets for 114 runs in England's first innings and 4 for 120 in the second for an 11-wicket haul in his maiden Test.

Personal life
Born in Karachi, Ahmed is the youngest among eight siblings (five brothers and three sisters), with his brother Shahzad Khan previously playing as a fast bowler for National Bank, and is a hafiz, having memorized the entire Qur'an.

He has cited his elder brother as the reason his talent was recognised early on in tape-ball cricket. Ahmed describes his mother and siblings as supportive from the beginning, but his father was eventually won over too and is now also supportive of his career. Upon being asked on his father's stance in a 2023 interview, he responded that his father is "very happy now". 

An ethnic Pashtun, his family moved to Karachi from Shinkiari, a small village located on the outskirts of Mansehra in Khyber Pakhtunkhwa.

Domestic career
A product of the Rashid Latif Academy, he made his Twenty20 debut for Karachi Kings on 10 February 2017 in the 2017 Pakistan Super League. He made his first-class debut on 20 November 2020, for Sindh, in the 2020–21 Quaid-e-Azam Trophy. In October 2021, he was named in the Pakistan Shaheens squad for their tour of Sri Lanka. He made his List A debut on 11 November 2021, for the Pakistan Shaheens against the Sri Lanka A cricket team.

Abrar Ahmad was picked up by Islamabad United at the draft for the PSL 2023. Former Pakistan Spinner, Saeed Ajmal, praised Abrar Ahmad a lot at the draft ceremony.

International career
In December 2022, Ahmed made his debut for Pakistan in the 2nd Test of the series against England. He became the first Pakistani bowler to take a 5-wicket haul in the first session on Test debut, taking 7 for 114 overall in the first innings and 4 for 120 in the second. He also became the thirteenth Pakistani bowler to take five-wicket haul on Test debut.

He was then named in the Pakistan squad for the Test series in the series against New Zealand, and in the first innings of the first Test he picked up another 5 wicket haul.

References

External links
 

1998 births
Living people
Pashtun people
Pakistani cricketers
Pakistan Test cricketers
Karachi cricketers
Karachi Whites cricketers
Karachi Kings cricketers
Sindh cricketers
People from Mansehra District
Peshawar Zalmi cricketers